"Tell That Girl to Shut Up" is a song written by American singer-songwriter Holly Beth Vincent and originally recorded by her band Holly and the Italians in 1979. A cover version by UK pop rock band Transvision Vamp was released in 1988 as the second single from their debut album Pop Art. In Australia, "Tell That Girl to Shut Up" was released in 1989 as the third single from the album, following the 1988 release of "Revolution Baby".

Transvision Vamp single
The B-side of the Transvision Vamp single, "God Save the Royalties", is the Pop Art album track "Psychosonic Cindy" remixed and in reverse (the title being a pun on saving royalty payments).

Track listings
7-inch and US cassette single 
A. "Tell That Girl to Shut Up" – 3:05
B. "God Save the Royalties" – 3:12

12-inch single 
A1. "Tell That Girl to Shut Up" (extended mix) – 6:20
B1. "Tell That Girl to Shut Up" (Knuckle Duster mix) – 4:44
B2. "God Save the Royalties" – 3:12

CD single 
 "Tell That Girl to Shut Up" (extended mix) – 6:20
 "God Save the Royalties" – 3:12
 "Tell That Girl to Shut Up" (7-inch version) – 3:05
 "Tell That Girl to Shut Up" (Knuckle Duster mix) – 4:44

Charts

References

External links
 

1979 songs
1988 singles
MCA Records singles
Transvision Vamp songs